Mohammad Abdul Munim Chowdhury is a Bangladeshi politician and businessman. He was the former MP of Habiganj-1, representing the Jatiya Party.

Early life
Chowdhury was born on 1 November 1967 to a Bengali Muslim family of Chowdhuries in the village of Kurshi in Nabiganj, Habiganj (then under Sylhet district), East Pakistan. His parents were Abdul Wadud Chowdhury and Husnara Begum Chowdhury. He has a H.S.C degree.

Career
Chowdhury was elected to Parliament on 5 January 2014 from Habiganj-1 as a Jatiya Party candidate.

References

Jatiya Party politicians
Living people
1967 births
10th Jatiya Sangsad members
People from Nabiganj Upazila